Muattar Nabieva (born 2 June 1996) is an Uzbekistani weightlifter. She is a bronze medalist at the Islamic Solidarity Games and a two-time bronze medalist at the Asian Weightlifting Championships. In 2021, she represented Uzbekistan at the 2020 Summer Olympics in Tokyo, Japan. In 2018, she represented Uzbekistan at the Asian Games in Jakarta, Indonesia.

Career 

She competed in the women's 58kg event at the 2015 World Weightlifting Championships held in Houston, United States. At the 2017 Islamic Solidarity Games held in Baku, Azerbaijan, she won the bronze medal in the women's 58kg event. At the 2017 Asian Indoor and Martial Arts Games held in Ashgabat, Turkmenistan, she won the silver medal in the women's 58kg event.

In 2018, she competed in the women's 58kg event at the Asian Games held in Jakarta, Indonesia. She finished in 4th place. At the 2018 World Weightlifting Championships in Ashgabat, Turkmenistan, she won the bronze medal in the women's 55kg Snatch event. She repeated this in the women's 55kg Snatch event at the 2019 World Weightlifting Championships held in Pattaya, Thailand.

At the 2019 Asian Weightlifting Championships held in Ningbo, China, she won the bronze medal in the women's 55kg event. In the same year, she also won the gold medal in the women's 55kg event at the 6th International Qatar Cup held in Doha, Qatar.

In 2021, she won the bronze medal in the women's 55kg event at the 2020 Asian Weightlifting Championships held in Tashkent, Uzbekistan. In July 2021, she represented Uzbekistan at the 2020 Summer Olympics in Tokyo, Japan. She finished in 4th place in the women's 55kg event. She also set a new Olympic Record of 98kg in the Snatch event.

Achievements

References

External links 
 

Living people
1996 births
Place of birth missing (living people)
Uzbekistani female weightlifters
Weightlifters at the 2018 Asian Games
Asian Games competitors for Uzbekistan
Islamic Solidarity Games competitors for Uzbekistan
Islamic Solidarity Games medalists in weightlifting
Weightlifters at the 2020 Summer Olympics
Olympic weightlifters of Uzbekistan
21st-century Uzbekistani women